Sergei Valentinovich Kolesnikov (January 4, 1955) is a Soviet and Russian film and theater actor, TV presenter, Honored Artist of Russia (1994).

Biography 
Sergei Kolesnikov was born on January 4, 1955, in Moscow in the family of Soviet intellectuals.  Mother – Maria Pavlovna Kolesnikova (1920). The father – Valentin Kolesnikov (1915–1977). The elder brother, Vladimir died, but there is a middle Igor Kolesnikov (1949).

In 1978 he graduated from the Moscow Art Theatre School (course  Sofya  Pilyavskaya and Vladimir Bogomolov)  and was accepted into the troupe of the Moscow Art Theater. After the division of the theater worked in the Gorky Moscow Art Theatre. In 1990 he moved to the Chekhov  Moscow Art Theatre, where he worked until October 2011.

Since May 21, 2006, to October 7, 2012, was the leading TV program Fazenda (Channel One Russia).

Selected filmography 
1992 / 1997: Trifles of Life as Sergei Kuznetsov
1994: St. Petersburg Secrets as  Investigator
2004: Daddy as Head of the hospital train
2005: The Case of Dead Souls as Derzhimorda
2007 / 2009: Daddy's Daughters as Permyakov
2009: Cold Souls as Dmitry
2011: Chapiteau Show as cameo
2013: A Good Day to Die Hard as Viktor Chagarin
2013: Secrets of the Institute for Noble Maidens as Prince Aleksey Sergeevich Vyshnevetsky
2014: Black Sea as Levchenko
2018: McMafia as priest

Personal life
 Wife Maria Alexandrovna Kolesnikova – artist of film, theater and TV.
 Sons Alexander (born in 1981) – graduated from the architectural and Ivan (born in 1983) – actor
Granddaughters Avdotya (born in 2006) and Vera (born in 2013) – Ivan's daughter.

Awards 
 Honored Artist of Russia (1994)
 Medal of the Order "For Merit to the Fatherland" (1998)

References

External links

 Страница о Колесникове
  Спектакль «Король Лир»

1955 births
Living people
Russian male film actors
Russian male stage actors
Russian male television actors
Male actors from Moscow
20th-century Russian male actors
21st-century Russian male actors
Russian television presenters
Soviet male film actors
Soviet male stage actors
Recipients of the Medal of the Order "For Merit to the Fatherland" II class
Honored Artists of the Russian Federation
Russian male voice actors
Moscow Art Theatre School alumni